WHEY (88.9 FM, "Hey 88.9") is a non-commercial educational radio station licensed to serve North Muskegon, Michigan, United States.  The station is owned and operated by Muskegon Community Radio Broadcast Company.

WHEY broadcasts a Christian Alternative Rock music format serving the Muskegon, Michigan, area.

History
This station received its original construction permit from the Federal Communications Commission on June 4, 2008.  The new station was assigned the call letters WHEY by the FCC on June 20, 2008.  WHEY received its license to cover from the FCC on November 25, 2008.

References

External links
 Hey 88.9 Online
 

HEY
Radio stations established in 2008